Sudanese Arabs are the inhabitants of Sudan who identify as Arabs and speak Arabic as their mother tongue. Part of them are descendants of Arabs who migrated to Sudan from the Arabian Peninsula, although the rest have been described as Arabized indigenous peoples of Sudan of mostly Nubian, Nilo-Saharan, and Cushitic ancestry who are culturally and linguistically Arab, with varying cases of admixture from Peninsular Arabs. The vast majority of Arab tribes in Sudan migrated there in the 12th century and intermarried with the Nubians and other indigenous populations, as well as introducing Islam. The Sudanese Arabs were described as a "hybrid of Arab and indigenous blood", and the Arabic they spoke was reported as "a pure but archaic Arabic". Burckhardt noted that the Ja'alin of the Eastern Desert are exactly like the Bedouin of Eastern Arabia.

Sudanese Arabs make up 70% of the population of Sudan, however prior to the independence of South Sudan in 2011, Sudanese Arabs made up only 40% of the population. They are predominantly Sunni Muslims and speak Sudanese Arabic. The great majority of the Sudanese Arabs tribes are part of larger tribal confederations: the Ja'alin, who primarily live along the Nile river basin between Khartoum and Abu Hamad, the Shaigiya, who live along the Nile between Korti and Jabal al-Dajer, and parts of the Bayuda Desert, the Juhaynah, who live east and west of the Nile, and include the Rufaa people, the Shukria clan and the Kababish, the Banu Fazara or Fezara people who live in Northern Kordofan, the Kawahla, who inhabit eastern Sudan, Northern Kordofan, and White Nile State, and the Baggara, who inhabit South Kordofan and extend to Lake Chad. There are numerous smaller tribal units that do not conform to the above groups, such as the Messelemiya, the Rikabia, the Hawawir people, the Magharba, the Awadia and Fadnia tribes, the Kerriat, the Kenana people, the Kerrarish, the Hamran, amongst others.

Sudan also houses non-Sudanese Arab populations such as the Rashaida that only recently settled Sudan in the 1846, after migrating from the Hejaz region of the Arabian Peninsula. Additionally, other smaller Sudanese groups who have also been Arabized, or partially Arabized, but retain a separate, non-Arab identity, include the Nubians, Copts, and Beja.

Regional variation
Arab tribes arrived in Sudan in three main waves, beginning with the Ja'alin in the 12th century. The Ja'alin trace their lineage to Abbas ibn Abd al-Muttalib and their culture was closely linked with that of the Bedouin in Arabia. The second main wave was the migration of the Juhaynah before the 17th century in two main subgroups, the Baggara and Kabbabish. The final main wave was the migration of Bani Rashid in the mid-19th century.

Most Sudanese Arabs speak modern Sudanese Arabic, with western Sudanese tribes bordering Chad like the Baggara and Darfurians generally speaking Chadian Arabic. Sudanese Arabs have large variations in culture and genealogy because of their descent from a combination of various population groups. Other Arab population in Sudan that are not Sudanese Arab, i.e. those that are recent arrivals to the region exist, and most of them such as the Awadia and Fadnia tribes, the Bani Hassan, Al-Ashraf and Rashaida tribes generally speak Hejazi Arabic instead of the more widespread Sudanese Arabic.

Sudanese Arabic

In 1889 the Journal of the Royal Anthropological Institute of Great Britain claimed that the Arabic spoken in Sudan was "a pure but archaic Arabic". The pronunciation of certain letters was like Hijazi, and not Egyptian, such as g being the pronunciation for the Arabic letter Qāf and J being the pronunciation for Jeem.

Religion

Islam

Most Sudanese Muslims are adherents of the Sunni branch of Islam; Sunni Islam in Sudan is not marked by a uniform body of belief and practice, however. Some Muslims opposed aspects of Sunni orthodoxy, and rites having a non-Islamic origin were widespread, being accepted as if they were integral to Islam, or sometimes being recognized as separate. Moreover, Sunni Islam in Sudan (as in much of Africa) has been characterized by the formation of religious orders or brotherhoods, each of which made special demands on its adherents.

Five pillars

Sunni Islam requires its adherents to follow the Five Pillars of Islam. The first pillar, the shahadah or profession of faith is the affirmation "There is no god but God (Allah) and Muhammad is his prophet." It is the first step in becoming a Muslim and a significant part of prayer. The second obligation is prayer at five specified times of the day. The third enjoins almsgiving. The fourth requires fasting during daylight hours in the month of Ramadan. The fifth requires a pilgrimage to Mecca for those able to perform it, to participate in the special rites that occur during the twelfth month of the lunar calendar.
Most Sudanese Muslims are born to the faith and meet the first requirement. Conformity to the second requirement is more variable. Many males in the cities and larger towns manage to pray five times a day: at dawn, noon, midafternoon, sundown, and evening. The well-to-do perform little work during Ramadan, and many businesses close or operate on reduced schedules. In the early 1990s, its observance appeared to be widespread, especially in urban areas and among sedentary Sudanese Muslims.

The pilgrimage to Mecca is less costly and arduous for the Sudanese than it is for many Muslims. Nevertheless, it takes time (or money if travel is by air), and the ordinary Sudanese Muslim has generally found it difficult to accomplish, rarely undertaking it before middle age. Some have joined pilgrimage societies into which members pay a small amount monthly and choose one of their number when sufficient funds have accumulated to send someone on the pilgrimage. A returned pilgrim is entitled to use the honorific title hajj or hajjih for a woman.

Another ceremony commonly observed is the great feast Id al Adha (also known as Id al Kabir), representing the sacrifice made during the last days of the pilgrimage. The centerpiece of the day is the slaughter of a sheep, which is distributed to the poor, kin, neighbors, and friends, as well as the immediate family.

Islam imposes a standard of conduct encouraging generosity, fairness, and honesty towards other Muslims. Sudanese Arabs, especially those who are wealthy, are expected by their coreligionists to be generous.

Islam in Sudanese law
In accordance with Islamic law most Sudanese Muslims do not eat pork. Conformity to the prohibitions on gambling and alcohol is less widespread. Usury is also forbidden by Islamic law, but Islamic banks have developed other ways of making money available to the public. Some Sudanese are skeptical of Islamic Banking—seeing it as an attempt by the religious elite to mask exploitative capitalist banking practices under a guise of religious sanctity

In Sudan (until 1983) modern criminal and civil, including commercial, law generally prevailed. In the north, however, the sharia, was expected to govern what is usually called family and personal law, i.e., matters such as marriage, divorce, and inheritance. In the towns and in some sedentary communities sharia was accepted, but in other sedentary communities and among nomads local custom was likely to prevailparticularly with respect to inheritance.

In September 1983, Nimeiri imposed the sharia throughout the land, eliminating the civil and penal codes by which the country had been governed in the twentieth century. Traditional Islamic punishments were imposed for theft, adultery, homicide, and other crimes. The zealousness with which these punishments were carried out contributed to the fall of Nimeiri. Nevertheless, no successor government has shown inclination to abandon the sharia.

Other influences
Islam is monotheistic and insists that there can be no intercessors between an individual and God. Nevertheless, Sudanese Islam includes a belief in spirits as sources of illness or other afflictions and in magical ways of dealing with them. The imam of a mosque is a prayer leader and preacher of sermons. He may also be a teacher and in smaller communities combines both functions. In the latter role, he is called a faqih (pl., fuqaha), although a faqih need not be an imam. In addition to teaching in the local Qur'anic school (khalwa), the faqih is expected to write texts (from the Qur'an) or magical verses to be used as amulets and cures. His blessing may be asked at births, marriages, deaths, and other important occasions, and he may participate in wholly non-Islamic harvest rites in some remote places. All of these functions and capacities make the faqih the most important figure in popular Islam. But he is not a priest. His religious authority is based on his putative knowledge of the Qur'an, the sharia, and techniques for dealing with occult threats to health and well- being. The notion that the words of the Qur'an will protect against the actions of evil spirits or the evil eye is deeply embedded in popular Islam, and the amulets prepared by the faqih are intended to protect their wearers against these dangers.

In Sudan as in much of African Islam, the cult of the saint is of considerable importance, although some Muslims would reject it. The development of the cult is closely related to the presence of the religious orders; many who came to be considered saints on their deaths were founders or leaders of religious orders who in their lifetimes were thought to have barakah, a state of blessedness implying an indwelling spiritual power inherent in the religious office. Baraka intensifies after death as the deceased becomes a wali (literally friend of God, but in this context translated as saint). The tomb and other places associated with the saintly being become the loci of the person's baraka, and in some views he or she becomes the guardian spirit of the locality. The intercession of the wali is sought on a variety of occasions, particularly by those seeking cures or by barren women desiring children. A saint's annual holy day is the occasion of a local festival that may attract a large gathering.

Better-educated Muslims in Sudan may participate in prayer at a saint's tomb but argue that prayer is directed only to God. Many others, however, see the saint not merely as an intercessor with and an agent of God, but also as a nearly autonomous source of blessing and power, thereby approaching "popular" as opposed to orthodox Islam.

Movements and religious orders
Islam made its deepest and longest lasting impact in Sudan through the activity of the Islamic religious brotherhoods or orders. These orders emerged in the Middle East in the twelfth century in connection with the development of Sufism, a reaction based in mysticism to the strongly legalistic orientation of mainstream Islam. These orders first came to Sudan in the sixteenth century and became significant in the eighteenth. Sufism seeks for its adherents a closer personal relationship with God through special spiritual disciplines. The exercises (or dhikr) include reciting prayers and passages of the Qur'an and repeating the names, or attributes, of God while performing physical movements according to the formula established by the founder of the particular order. Singing and dancing may be introduced. The outcome of an exercise, which lasts much longer than the usual daily prayer, is often a state of ecstatic abandon.

A mystical or devotional way (sing. tariqa; pl. turuq) is the basis for the formation of particular orders, each of which is also called a tariqa. The specialists in religious law and learning initially looked askance at Sufism and the Sufi orders, but the leaders of Sufi orders in Sudan have won acceptance by acknowledging the significance of the sharia and not claiming that Sufism replaces it.

The principal turuq vary considerably in their practice and internal organization. Some orders are tightly organized in hierarchical fashion; others have allowed their local branches considerable autonomy. There may be as many as a dozen turuq in Sudan. Some are restricted to that country; others are widespread in Africa or the Middle East. Several turuq, for all practical purposes independent, are offshoots of older orders and were established by men who altered in major or minor ways the tariqa of the orders to which they had formerly been attached.

The oldest and most widespread of the turuq is the Qadiriyah founded by Abdul Qadir Jilani in Baghdad in the twelfth century and introduced into Sudan in the sixteenth. The Qadiriyah's principal rival and the largest tariqa in the western part of the country was the Tijaniyah, a sect begun by Sidi Ahmed al-Tidjani at Tijani in Morocco, which eventually penetrated Sudan in about 1810 via the western Sahel (a narrow band of savanna bordering the southern Sahara, stretching across Africa). Many Tijani became influential in Darfur, and other adherents settled in northern Kurdufan. Later on, a class of Tijani merchants arose as markets grew in towns and trade expanded, making them less concerned with providing religious leadership. Of greater importance to Sudan was the tariqa established by the followers of Sayyid Ahmad ibn Idris, known as Al Fasi, who died in 1837. Although he lived in Arabia and never visited Sudan, his students spread into the Nile Valley establishing indigenous Sudanese orders which include the Majdhubiyah, the Idrisiyah, the Ismailiyah, and the Khatmiyyah.

Much different in organization from the other brotherhoods is the Khatmiyyah (or Mirghaniyah after the name of the order's founder). Established in the early nineteenth century by Muhammad Uthman al Mirghani, it became the best organized and most politically oriented and powerful of the turuq in eastern Sudan (see Turkiyah). Mirghani had been a student of Sayyid Ahmad ibn Idris and had joined several important orders, calling his own order the seal of the paths (Khatim at Turuq—hence Khatmiyyah). The salient features of the Khatmiyyah are the extraordinary status of the Mirghani family, whose members alone may head the order; loyalty to the order, which guarantees paradise; and the centralized control of the order's branches.

The Khatmiyyah had its center in the southern section of Ash Sharqi State and its greatest following in eastern Sudan and in portions of the riverine area. The Mirghani family were able to turn the Khatmiyyah into a political power base, despite its broad geographical distribution, because of the tight control they exercised over their followers. Moreover, gifts from followers over the years have given the family and the order the wealth to organize politically. This power did not equal, however, that of the Mirghanis' principal rival, the Ansar, or followers of the Mahdi, whose present-day leader was Sadiq al-Mahdi, the great-grandson of Muhammad Ahmad, who drove the Egyptian administration from Sudan in 1885.

Most other orders were either smaller or less well organized than the Khatmiyyah. Moreover, unlike many other African Muslims, Sudanese Muslims did not all seem to feel the need to identify with one or another tariqa, even if the affiliation were nominal. Many Sudanese Muslims preferred more political movements that sought to change Islamic society and governance to conform to their own visions of the true nature of Islam.

One of these movements, Mahdism, was founded in the late nineteenth century. It has been likened to a religious order, but it is not a tariqa in the traditional sense. Mahdism and its adherents, the Ansar, sought the regeneration of Islam, and in general were critical of the turuq. Muhammad Ahmad ibn as Sayyid Abd Allah, a faqih, proclaimed himself to be al-Mahdi al-Muntazar ("the awaited guide in the right path"), the messenger of God and representative of the Prophet Muhammad, an assertion that became an article of faith among the Ansar. He was sent, he said, to prepare the way for the second coming of the Prophet Isa (Jesus) and the impending end of the world. In anticipation of Judgment Day, it was essential that the people return to a simple and rigorous, even puritanical Islam (see Mahdiyah). The idea of the coming of a Mahdi has roots in Sunni Islamic traditions. The issue for Sudanese and other Muslims was whether Muhammad Ahmad was in fact the Mahdi.

In the century since the Mahdist uprising, the neo-Mahdist movement and the Ansar, supporters of Mahdism from the west, have persisted as a political force in Sudan. Many groups, from the Baqqara cattle nomads to the largely sedentary tribes on the White Nile, supported this movement. The Ansar were hierarchically organized under the control of Muhammad Ahmad's successors, who have all been members of the Mahdi family (known as the ashraf). The ambitions and varying political perspectives of different members of the family have led to internal conflicts, and it appeared that Sadiq al-Mahdi, putative leader of the Ansar since the early 1970s, did not enjoy the unanimous support of all Mahdists. Mahdist family political goals and ambitions seemed to have taken precedence over the movement's original religious mission. The modern-day Ansar were thus loyal more to the political descendants of the Mahdi than to the religious message of Mahdism.

A movement that spread widely in Sudan in the 1960s, responding to the efforts to secularize Islamic society, was the Muslim Brotherhood (Al Ikhwan al Muslimin). Originally the Muslim Brotherhood, often known simply as the Brotherhood, was conceived as a religious revivalist movement that sought to return to the fundamentals of Islam in a way that would be compatible with the technological innovations introduced from the West. Disciplined, highly motivated, and well financed the Brotherhood became a powerful political force during the 1970s and 1980s, although it represented only a small minority of Sudanese. In the government that was formed in June 1989, following a bloodless coup d'état, the Brotherhood exerted influence through its political wing, the National Islamic Front (NIF) party, which included several cabinet members among its adherents.

Genetics
According to Y-DNA analysis by Hassan et al. (2008), among Sudanese Arabs, 67% of Arakien, 43% of Meseria, and 40% of Galilean individuals carry the Haplogroup J. The remainder mainly belong to the E1b1b clade, which is borne by 18% of Galilean, 17% of Arakien, and 14% of Meseria. The next most frequently observed haplogroups among Sudanese Arabs are the European-associated R1 clade (25% Meseria, 16% Gaalien, 8% Arakien), followed by the Eurasian lineage F (11% Meseria, 10% Galilean, 8% Arakien), the Europe-associated I clade (7% Meseria, 4% Galilean), and the African A3b2 haplogroup (6% Gaalien).

Maternally, Hassan (2009) observed that over 90% of the Sudanese Arabs samples carried various subclades of the Macrohaplogroup L. Of these mtDNA lineages, the most frequently borne clade was L3 (68% Galilean, 40% Meseria, 24% Arakien), followed by the L2 (53% Arakien, 33% Meseria, 9% Galilean), L0a1 (13% Meseria), L1 (7% Meseria, 5% Galilean), and L5 (9% Galilean, 6% Arakien) haplogroups. The remaining ~10% of Sudanese Arabs belonged to sublineages of the Eurasian macrohaplogroup N (Arakien: 6% preHV1, 6% N1a, 6% N/J1b; Galilean: 9% preHV1; Meseria: 7% N/J1b).

Dobon et al. (2015) identified an ancestral autosomal component of West Eurasian origin that is common to many modern Sudanese Arabs (as well as other North Sudan populations). Known as the Coptic component, it peaks among Egyptian Copts who settled in Sudan over the past two centuries. The scientists associate the Coptic component with Ancient Egyptian ancestry, without the later Arabian influence that is present among other Egyptians. Hollfelder et al. (2017) analysed various populations in Sudan and observed close autosomal affinities between their Nubian and Sudanese Arab samples, with both groups showing notable admixture from Eurasian populations. Genetic distance analysis in 1988, showed that the Beja and Gaalien tribes have more pronounced Arab genetic characteristics than the Hawazma and Messeria.

Music

Sudan has a rich and unique musical culture that has been through chronic instability and repression during the modern history of Sudan. Beginning with the imposition of strict sharia law in 1989, many of the country's most prominent poets, like Mahjoub Sharif, were imprisoned while others, like Mohammed el Amin (returned to Sudan in the mid 1990s) and Mohammed Wardi (returned to Sudan 2003), fled to Cairo. Traditional music suffered too, with traditional Zār ceremonies being interrupted and drums confiscated . At the same time, however, the European militaries contributed to the development of Sudanese music by introducing new instruments and styles; military bands, especially the Scottish bagpipes, were renowned, and set traditional music to military march music. The march March Shulkawi No 1, is an example, set to the sounds of the Shilluk.

Clothing

Given the cultural and religious differences within the country, Sudanese clothing varies among the different parts and peoples of Sudan. However, most individual Sudanese wear either traditional or western attire. A traditional garb widely worn in Sudan is the jalabiya, which is a loose-fitting, long-sleeved, collarless ankle-length garment also common to Egypt, Ethiopia and Eritrea. The jalabiya is accompanied by a large scarf worn by men, and the garment may be white, colored, striped, and made of fabric varying in thickness, depending on the season of the year and personal preferences. Another traditional piece of clothing is the toub (pronounced toʊb). This is a large piece of fabric that measures around (4.5mx120m)or (4.5x110)depending on the way that its going to be worn is it the traditional way or the modern way, basically you just wrapped around the body in a particular way. Something is usually worn under it to prevent exposure of private areas. This garment is worn by women.

References

Further reading
A History of the Arabs in the Sudan and Some Account of the People who ... (1922)
A history of the Arabs in the Sudan and some account of the people who preceded them and of the tribes inhabiting Darfur (1922)
A history of the Arabs in the Sudan and some account of the people who preceded them and of the tribes inhabiting Dárûr (1922)
A history of the Arabs in the Sudan and some account of the people who preceded them and of the tribes inhabiting Darfur (1922)
A history of the Arabs in the Sudan and some account of the people who preceded them and of the tribes inhabiting Dárûr (1922)
A History of the Arbas in the Sudan and Some Account of the People who Preceded Them and of the Tribes Inhabiting Darfur3
A History of the Arabs in the Sudan: And Some Account of the People who Preceded Them and of the Tribes Inhabiting Dárfūr
A History of the Arabs in the Sudan and Some Account of the People who Preceded Them and of the Tribes Inhabiting Dárfūr, Volume 2
A History of the Arabs in the Sudan: The native manuscripts of the Sudan

 
Ethnic groups in Sudan
Ethnic groups in North Africa
Arabs